The Zagrebački električni tramvaj (ZET) is the transit authority responsible for public transport in Zagreb, the capital of Croatia, and parts of the surrounding Zagreb County. It is one of the municipal companies controlled by Zagreb Holding.

ZET operates an extensive bus system, 19 tram lines (15 daytime lines and 4 nighttime lines), a gondola lift and a funicular line. Historically, ZET workshops also produced trams (namely, types M-22, M-24 and three TMK 101 prototypes).

Tram 

The first tram line was opened on September 5, 1891, setting off a vital part of the Zagreb mass transit system. During the day every line runs on average every 5–10 minutes, but almost every station serves at least two routes. Nighttime lines have exact timetables averaging at about every 40 minutes. Daytime lines also have timetables, but they don't usually abide to them due to traffic fluctuations that can prolong a trip by more than 30 minutes, leading to frequent gaps at and after rush hour.

Rolling stock is very diverse. It currently includes around 240 motor units of 6 different tram types (June 2010). On a normal work day there are over 193 units used in traffic.

Bus 

ZET currently runs 134 bus lines, providing services not only to the city of Zagreb, but also to other satellite towns such as Zaprešić, Velika Gorica, Bistra, etc. Bus service frequencies vary depending on the number of passengers on a certain line- some bus lines have 5 minute intervals, others 15, or even 50-minute intervals, and some run only in peak times. Physical (paper) Timetables are given only for the first and the last stops, but online (www.zet.hr) you can see timetables for every stop on every line. Buses generally serve as feeders for tram system.

Rolling stock 
Current stock is around 300 units, and it consists of MAN, Mercedes-Benz and Irisbus-Iveco buses. Buses are mostly low-floor, with high-floor buses in use only on suburban-regional routes. In June, 2007 ZET started using biodiesel in 11 busses, and since 2009 sixty CNG buses are in use. ZET is planning to use biodiesel and CNG 50:50% in their buses in early future.

Routes

Urban routes 
Urban bus system consists of 78 routes: 101-110, 112-116, 118-143, 146, 150, 201-210, 212-234, 236-238; although routes 112, 132, 208, 209 and a few others might be described as suburban. City buses and trams are entirely in the 1st tariff zone. The network is constantly expanding, and new routes to neighborhoods Donje Svetice, Podbrežje and a few others are expected soon.

Suburban routes 
Out of 56 suburban routes, 23 of them run in the City of Zagreb administrative area: numbers 159-164, 166, 168, 261-263, 269-280. Since tariff system change put in service on January 1, 2006, all routes on the territory of City of Zagreb have been running in the 1st zone.

Suburban routes outside of City of Zagreb run in zones 1-4, most of them beginning at tram terminals in the first zone, connecting the city with surrounding villages and towns, but some of the routes also begin in towns Zaprešić and Velika Gorica. These 35 lines go to following areas in Zagreb County: cities Velika Gorica (268, 290, 302-305, 307-311, 313, 315, 319-325, 330, 335) and Zaprešić (170, 172, 180, 181, 182) and municipalities of Luka (174), Bistra (175-177), Jakovlje (178), Klinča Sela (165, 169) and Stupnik (111, 164).

The longest route is the 35-km route 311 (Main Station-Cerovski Vrh), though most of suburban routes are about 20 km long.

See also: List of bus lines (PDF file)

City bus gallery

Funicular 

The only funicular in Zagreb is operated by ZET, connecting the Tomićeva Street with Strossmayerovo Promenade to the north.

The funicular was built in 1890 and has been in operation since April 23, 1893. It has two cars for 28 passengers each. It runs on 1200 mm gauge rails, track length is only 66 m, but height difference is 30.5 m and inclination 52%. This makes it one of the shortest, but also one of the steepest funiculars in the world. It runs at a speed of 1.5 m/s, needing 1 minute  to complete the trip.

Gondola lift / Cable Car 

City of Zagreb operates gondola lift or Cable Car service towards Sljeme on Medvednica  Service is around 5047m long  with the height difference of 750 meters. A cabin can hold eight adults and service in peak time can operate Gondola car every 40 seconds either way. Tickets are between 50Croatian kuna for locals or 75Kuna (10€) for visitors one way, the return ticket price is around 125kuna.  

Previous gondola lift was in operation from 1963-07-27 to 2007-06-30, when it officially ceased to operate.

Modern Gondola lift Cable Car was put in operation in 2017, the old system was completely rebuilt from scratch, with new larger more comfortable cars in use currently, improvements to speed, higher wind resistance and about 1030 m longer route - 130 m towards north until the peak of the mountain, and 900 m towards south down to the Dolje tram terminal ensures better connection with the Zagreb city Tram ZET. Service is very popular in winter months when Zagreb hosts noumber of international winter sport events.

References

External links 

 ZET website
 The photo-report on Zagreb trams
 Zeljeznice.net
 Tram in Zagreb
 
 

Bus companies of Croatia
Intermodal transport authorities
1891 establishments in Austria-Hungary
Transport in Zagreb
Metre gauge railways in Croatia
Public transport in Croatia
Tram